Control is a 1982 novel by William Goldman.

The book was a runner up on The New York Times best seller list.

Although Goldman was a noted screenwriter and many of his novels had been adapted into films there was no interest in adapting Control. Goldman later wrote the novel "was such a neat idea for a movie. I felt sure that somebody would want to make it. It was about trying to control the future by controlling the past. There was never a phone call about Control."

References

External links
Review of book at The New York Times

1982 American novels
Novels by William Goldman